Dímelo may refer to

Music
"Dimelo" (Rak-Su song)
Dímelo, album by Manzanita (2000)
"Dímelo", the Spanish version of "Do You Know? (The Ping Pong Song)" by Enrique Iglesias
"Dímelo", the Spanish version of "I Need to Know" by Marc Anthony
"Dímelo", the Spanish version of "Say It" by Voices of Theory
"Dímelo", by Paulo Londra from Homerun

See also
"Dímelo a mí", Spanish version of "Parla con me" by Eros Ramazzotti